VA Long Beach Healthcare System, former Naval Hospital Long Beach is a large medical treatment facility in Long Beach, California.  The Veterans Administration Hospital operates the hospital on 100 acres of land at 5901 E 7th St, Long Beach. The hospital has primary care, tertiary care, and long-term care in areas of medicine, surgery, psychiatry, physical medicine and rehabilitation, neurology, oncology, dentistry, spinal cord injury, geriatrics, blind rehabilitation and extended care. The VA Hospital opened on June 1, 1950.

The hospital opened in 1942 as a Naval Hospital in 1942 with 300 beds to serve wounded World War 2 servicemen. By the end of the war in 1945, the Naval Hospital had 1800 beds. Naval Hospital Long Beach also served as a major teaching hospital for the US Navy.  In 1950 the Naval transferred the hospital to the Veterans Administration at the request of the President of the United States and the Secretary of Defense. The Navy purchased the land on September 25, 1941 from the Bixby family of Rancho Los Alamitos.

Congress did not appropriate money for a new Navy hospital until 1960 and provided $9 million to build a 500-bed facility on land sold to the Navy by the city which was located at Carson and the San Gabriel River.

The original site of the Navy hospital constructed at Carson Street and the San Gabriel River is now the Long Beach Towne Center.

See also

California during World War II
American Theater (1939–1945)
United States home front during World War II
DeWitt General Hospital
Long Beach Naval Shipyard

References

External links

Hospitals in Los Angeles County, California
1942 establishments in California
Long Beach, California
Veterans Affairs medical facilities
Military facilities in Greater Los Angeles
Hospitals established in 1942